An-Nazla al-Gharbiya is a Palestinian village in the Tulkarm Governorate in the eastern West Bank, located 16 kilometers North of Tulkarm.

History
Pottery remains from the  Roman era have been found here.

Southwest of the village, on the top of hill, is the tomb of Sheikh Khalil. It is constructed of old, reused stones, and pottery sherds from the Byzantine era have been found here.

Pottery from the early Muslim and the Middle Ages have been found here.

Ottoman era
In 1882,  the PEF's Survey of Western Palestine   described An-Nazla al-Gharbiya, then called Nuzlet et Tinat: "A little  hamlet with fig trees, and a well to the west on low ground. It has caves opposite to it on the south."

British Mandate era
In the 1931 census of Palestine, conducted by the British Mandate authorities, Nazla al Gharbiya had a population of  64 Muslims, in a total of 13 houses.

In the  1945 statistics  the population of Nazla el Gharbiya was 100 Muslims,  with 2,320   dunams of land  according to an official land and population survey. Of this, 182 dunams were plantations and irrigable land, 556 were used for cereals, while 2 dunams were built-up (urban) land.

Jordanian era
In the wake of the 1948 Arab–Israeli War, and after the 1949 Armistice Agreements, An-Nazla al-Gharbiya  came under Jordanian rule.

In 1961, the population of Nazla Gharbiya was  187.

Post 1967
After the Six-Day War in 1967, An-Nazla al-Gharbiya  has been under Israeli occupation.

According to the Palestinian Central Bureau of Statistics, an-Nazla al-Gharbiya had a population of approximately 885 inhabitants in mid-year 2006. 6.1% of the population of an-Nazla al-Gharbiya were refugees in 1997. The healthcare facilities for the surrounding villages are based in Baqa ash-Sharqiyya, where the facilities are designated as MOH level 3.

References

Bibliography

External links
 Welcome To al-Nazla al-Gharbiya
Survey of Western Palestine, Map 11:    IAA, Wikimedia commons

Villages in the West Bank
Tulkarm Governorate
Municipalities of the State of Palestine